John Bell (1812–1895) was a British sculptor, born in Bell's Row, Great Yarmouth, Norfolk.  His family home was Hopton Hall, Suffolk. His works were shown at the Great Exhibition of 1851, and he was responsible for the marble group representing "America" on the Albert Memorial in London.

Life
John Bell was born at Hopton Hall Hopton, Suffolk in 1812, and educated in the village school in Catfield, Norfolk.

He studied sculpture in the Royal Academy Schools from 1829, and exhibited his first work at the academy, a religious group, in 1832. The next year he exhibited A Girl at a Brook and John the Baptist at the academy, and two statuettes at the Suffolk Street Gallery, followed by Ariel in 1834. At the Royal Academy in 1836 he showed Psyche feeding a Swan and Youth, Spring, and Infancy. 

In 1837, the year in which Bell established his reputation, his works at the Academy included  Psyche and the Dove and a model of The Eagle-Shooter, the first version of what was to become one of his most celebrated statues; he also exhibited two busts, Amoret and Psyche, at the British Institution.  His Babes in the Wood was exhibited at the Royal Academy summer exhibition two years later. There are marble versions at Osborne House, and Norwich Castle.

In 1844 Bell entered his Eagle Slayer and Jane Shore in the competition held for sculpture for the new Houses of Parliament. A cast-iron version of the Eagle Slayer - the first statue ever to be made from the material - was produced for The Great Exhibition of 1851, where it stood under a canopy surmounted by the eagle. It was later placed outside the South Kensington Museum, and is now in the V&A Museum of Childhood in Bethnal Green. He also exhibited a sculpture of Shakespeare at the 1851 exhibition, which was widely reproduced, for example on the front page of Recollections of the Great Exhibition.

For Coalbrookdale he created the Deerhound hall table and Andromeda which was bought by Queen Victoria and is now a feature of the gardens at Osborne House.

Una and the Lion, inspired by Edmund Spenser's The Faerie Queene was also exhibited at the Great Exhibition of 1851, and reproduced in miniature in parian ware by Mintons. The full-scale model was placed in the Crystal Palace which burned down in 1936.

His best-known work is the Crimean war monument to the Brigade of Guards  at the junction of Pall Mall and Waterloo Place, London.

Bell's 1862 sculpture of Oliver Cromwell originally designed for the 1862 International Exhibition was erected in 1899 in Warrington, Cheshire.

In 1864 Bell accepted the commission to create a marble group representing America, as one of the four large sculptures representing the continents, for the corners of the Albert Memorial in Kensington Gardens. He decided to create an allegory of human progress in the Americas, with figures representing Canada and the United States in the lead and two others representing Central and South America at the rear, all grouped around a massive bison. He also proposed, unsuccessfully,  a kneeling effigy of Prince Albert as a soldier of Christ for the memorial, following the death in 1867 of Carlo Marochetti, who had been working on the prince's statue.

In 1868, Bell created a female nude from grey-veined marble named The Octoroon, a woman whose one eighth percentage of African blood renders her a slave. According to Mia L. Bagneris it "reflects Victorian Britain’s fascination with the enslaved, American, mixed-race beauty and suggests provocative resonances between the antebellum South and the Orient in the popular imagination." It was purchased in 1876 by the town of Blackburn and can be seen at the Blackburn Museum & Art Gallery.

In 1877, he created a bronze The Manacled Slave/On the Sea Shore.

Bell died on 14 March 1895 at 15 Douro Place, Kensington.

Legacy
His pupil Francis John Williamson also became a successful sculptor, reputed to have been Queen Victoria's favourite.

His sculpture of Shakespeare at the 1851 exhibition was used by John Leech as the centrepiece of his cartoon Dinner-time at the Crystal Palace, published in Punch.

Reception
In 2022, the curators of The Colour of Anxiety, an exhibition at the Henry Moore Institute in Leeds, which shows two of Bell´s sculptures The Manacled Slave/On the Sea Shore and  The Octoroon, have commented that " While white male sculptors such as John Bell and Charles Cordier intended to bring the pathos of the institution of slavery to public attention, yet they nonetheless traded on the allure of illicit sexuality born of that same system."

References

Sources

Attribution

External links
 
yourarchives.nationalarchives.gov.uk
myweb.tiscali.co.uk
frontierpublishing.co.uk
rsa.org.uk
spencer.lib.ku.edu
youricons.macrojuice.com
museums.norfolk.gov.uk

1812 births
1895 deaths
People from Great Yarmouth
19th-century British sculptors
British male sculptors
19th-century British male artists